Racko may refer to:

 Rack-O, a card game
 Filip Racko (born 1985), Czech footballer
 Arpád Račko (1930–2015), Slovak sculptor